Judith Moen Stanley (born November 28, 1954), known professionally as Judi Moen and Judith Moen, is a former talk show host and news reporter for WBBM-TV in Chicago from 1981 until 1994 and a program host for the Travel Channel in the 1990s.

Early life and education 

A Minnesota native, Moen attended Ridgewater College in Minnesota and earned a master's degree in journalism in 1978 from Northwestern University's Medill School of Journalism.

Professional career 

Moen began her broadcasting career working for TV stations in Rockford, Illinois and Charleston, South Carolina.  In 1981, Moen joined WBBM-TV in Chicago as the host of the weekday morning public-affairs program Daybreak.  Moen also co-hosted the public-affairs program Two on 2 along with Bob Wallace and later with Aldo Gandia until the program was canceled in 1988.  After Two on 2 was canceled, Moen stayed at WBBM until 1993, working as a fill-in general assignment news reporter and also hosting local weekday morning news cut-ins and a weekend talk show titled Newday Chicago.

Moen left WBBM-TV in 1990 to care for her family, but returned in late 1991 as a part-time and weekend reporter.  She left the station for a second time in 1994.

Moen moved to WTKR-TV in Norfolk, Virginia in the mid-1990s, and also worked for the Travel Channel, hosting a series on romantic inns.

Today, Moen and her husband, Thomas B. Stanley III, live in the Atlanta area and advocates on behalf of people with disabilities.

References 

Living people
1954 births
American television reporters and correspondents
Medill School of Journalism alumni